The Fairy Queen, in English folklore, traditionally ruled the fairies.

Fairy Queen may also refer to:

Literature and fine art
The Faerie Queene, a poem by Edmund Spenser published in two parts, in 1590 and 1596
The Fairy Queen (Fablehaven), a fictional character in Brandon Mull's 2000s Fablehaven series

Music and opera
The Fairy-Queen, a 1692 semi-opera by Purcell based on Shakespeare's Midsummer Night's Dream
The Fairy Queen, a 1946 ballet based on the opera with choreography by Sir Frederick Ashton and music by Henry Purcell
 "Faerie Queen" (song), a song by Heather Alexander from the 1994 album Wanderlust
"Faerie Queen", a song by Blackmore's Night from the 2006 album The Village Lanterne
 Fairy Queen (1988) and The Fairy Queen (2004), albums by the musical artist Kenny Klein

Other uses
Fairy Queen (locomotive), an Indian steam locomotive

See also
 Fairy (disambiguation)
 Queen (disambiguation)